Guillaume Gontard (born 11 March 1971) is a French politician who is president of the Ecologist group in the French Senate.

Political career 
Guillaume Gontard was born on March 11, 1971, in Tours (Indre-et-Loire). His family moved to the village of Percy (Isère) in the Trièves (country of his ancestors) when he was 4 years old. He began his schooling in a single class at the municipal school of Le Monestier-du-Percy, he continued his studies at the college of Mens then at the Lycée Stendhal in Grenoble. Passionate about regional planning, he joined the Grenoble School of Architecture (ENSAG) and graduated in 1997.

He is co-manager of SARL B.A BA Architecture Aménagement.

Gontard served as mayor of Percy, Isère from 2008 to 2017. He was elected senator in Isère in the 2017 French Senate election.

Personal life 
He is married and the father of three children.

References 

1971 births
Living people
21st-century French politicians
French Senators of the Fifth Republic
Politicians from Tours, France
Mayors of places in Auvergne-Rhône-Alpes
Europe Ecology – The Greens politicians
French architects
Senators of Isère